Mian Volan-e Olya (also Romanized as Mīān Volān-e ‘Olyā, Mīān Velān-e ‘Olyā, and Mīānvolān-e ‘Olyā; also known as Meyān Velān, Mīān Velān, and Mīān Garān) is a village in Doab Rural District, in the Central District of Selseleh County, Lorestan Province, Iran. At the 2006 census, its population was 83, in 16 families.

References 

Towns and villages in Selseleh County